Kamalu (also Romanized as Kamālū; also known as Kamāl Lū) is a village in Kuhpayeh Rural District, Nowbaran District, Saveh County, Markazi Province, Iran. At the 2006 census, its population was 86, in 34 families.

References 

Populated places in Saveh County